The Greater Miami area is home to five major league sports teams — the Miami Dolphins of the National Football League, the Miami Heat of the National Basketball Association, the Miami Marlins of Major League Baseball, the Florida Panthers of the National Hockey League and Inter Miami CF of Major League Soccer.

Miami is also home to the Sony Ericsson Open for professional tennis, numerous greyhound racing tracks, marinas, jai alai venues, and golf courses. Miami is also home to Paso Fino horses, where competitions are held at Tropical Park Equestrian Center.

Major league teams 
The Miami area is home to five major league sports franchises. Currently, the Miami Heat and the Miami Marlins play their games within Miami's city limits. The Heat play their home games at the FTX Arena in Downtown Miami. The Miami Marlins home ballpark is LoanDepot Park, located in the Little Havana section of the city on the site of the old Orange Bowl stadium.

The city's first entry into the American Football League was the Miami Dolphins, which competed in the fourth AFL league from 1966 to 1969. In 1970 the Dolphins joined the NFL when the AFL–NFL merger occurred. The team made its first Super Bowl appearance in Super Bowl VI, but lost to the Dallas Cowboys. The following year, the Dolphins completed the NFL's only perfect season culminating in a Super Bowl win.  The 1972 Dolphins were the third NFL team to accomplish a perfect regular season, and they went on to win that year's Super Bowl VII, as well as the next year's Super Bowl VIII. Miami also appeared in Super Bowl XVII and Super Bowl XIX, losing both games. The Miami Dolphins play their games at Hard Rock Stadium in suburban Miami Gardens.

The Orange Bowl, a member of the College Football Playoff, hosts their college football bowl game annually at Hard Rock Stadium. The stadium has also hosted the Super Bowl; the Miami metro area has hosted the game a total of eleven times (six Super Bowls at the now Hard Rock Stadium, including most recently Super Bowl LIV and five at the Miami Orange Bowl), more than any other metro area.

The Miami Heat of the National Basketball Association were formed in 1988 as an expansion team. They have won three league championships (in 2006, 2012 and 2013), and six conference titles.

The Miami Marlins of Major League Baseball began play in the 1993 season. They won the World Series in 1997 and 2003.

The Florida Panthers of the National Hockey League were founded in 1993 as an expansion team. They have made one appearance in the Stanley Cup Finals in 1996. They play in nearby Sunrise at the FLA Live Arena.

Inter Miami CF of Major League Soccer was founded in 2018 as an expansion team. Inter Miami CF will play their first two seasons at the new Inter Miami modular stadium, which was built on the site of the old Lockhart Stadium in Fort Lauderdale. After its first two seasons should construction of the Miami Freedom Park be approved and completed in time the site will move to Miami. Inter Miami has demolished the old Lockhart stadium and has built a new modular stadium and 50,000 square-foot training facility. The site will remain the permanent training complex for the Clubs’ teams, including its youth Academy and Inter Fort Lauderdale CF. The agreement between them and the City of Fort Lauderdale required that their USL affiliate will use the site and not abbreviate the word "Fort."

Other professional teams

College sports 
Greater Miami is home to many college sports teams with football and basketball having preeminent status. The most prominent are the University of Miami Hurricanes whose football team plays at Hard Rock Stadium in Miami Gardens and whose men's and women's basketball teams play at Watsco Center on the University of Miami's campus in Coral Gables. The Florida Atlantic University Owls football team plays at FAU Stadium, and its men's basketball team plays at FAU Arena in Boca Raton. The Florida International University Panthers football team plays at FIU Stadium, and its basketball team plays at Ocean Bank Convocation Center in University Park.

Defunct and relocated teams 
A number of defunct teams were located in Miami, including:
 Basketball: Miami Floridians (ABA), Miami Sol (WNBA), Miami Tropics (ABA).
 Ice hockey: Miami Matadors (ECHL), Miami Screaming Eagles (WHA), Miami Manatees (WHA2), Tropical Hockey League.
 Soccer: Miami Toros / Ft. Lauderdale Strikers (NASL), Miami Fusion (NPSL)
 American football: Miami Seahawks (AAFC), Miami Tropics (SFL), Miami Hooters (Arena Football League).

The Miami Fusion, a defunct Major League Soccer team, played at Lockhart Stadium in nearby Broward County. The Miami Kickers, a Women's Premier Soccer League, played at American Heritage School in Plantation, Broward County.

In 1946, the Miami Seahawks played in the All-America Football Conference for one season, 1946, and then folded.

In 1996, Miami acquired the AFL team the Sacramento Attack, which was renamed as the Miami Hooters (due to its association with the Florida-based Hooters restaurant chain), and it played from 1993 to 1995. In 1996, the association with the chain was completed, and the team moved to West Palm Beach and renamed as the Florida Bobcats.

2026 FIFA World Cup
Miami will be one of eleven US host cities for the 2026 FIFA World Cup with matches set to be played at Hard Rock Stadium.

Notes

See also 
Miami Women's Rugby Club
Sports in Florida
U.S. cities with teams from four major sports

References